Jazz All Around is a 1969 Danish drama film directed by Knud Leif Thomsen. It was entered into the 6th Moscow International Film Festival.

Cast
 Finn Storgaard as Peter Hasvig
 Lotte Wæver as Ellen
 Anne-Lise Gabold as Vera Bagger
 Torben Jetsmark as Hugo
 Elsebeth Reingaard as Ida Schmidt
 Gitte Reingaard as Esther Schmidt
 Sisse Reingaard as Stuepige
 Susanne Heinrich as Eva Bagger
 Steen Frøhne as Johannes
 Søren Rode as Hjalmer
 Søren Strømberg as Kontorelev

References

External links
 

1969 films
1969 drama films
Danish drama films
1960s Danish-language films
Danish black-and-white films
Films directed by Knud Leif Thomsen
Best Danish Film Bodil Award winners